The Midwest Rugby Football Union (MRFU) is a Territorial Union (TU) for rugby union teams playing in the Midwestern United States. It is one of seven TUs that governed a specific region of USA Rugby. It was founded in 1964.

In 2013, USA Rugby reorganized from Territorial Unions (TU's) to Geographical Unions (GU's).

Local Area Unions (LAU's)
Allegheny Rugby Union official site
Chicago Area Rugby Football Union (CARFU) new official site
Illinois Rugby Union official site
Indiana Rugby Football Union official site
Iowa Rugby Union official site
Michigan Rugby Football Union official site
Minnesota Rugby Football Union (MNRFU) official site
Ohio Rugby Union official site
Wisconsin Rugby Football Union (WRFU) official site

See also
 USA Rugby
 Indiana High School Rugby

References

External links
MRFU Official Site
Midwest Rugby Territorial News Site
USA Rugby Official Site
IRB Official Site

Sports organizations established in 1964
Rugby union governing bodies in the United States
Rugby union in Indiana
1964 establishments in the United States